Barceloneic acid B is a cytotoxic isolate of Penicillium albocoremium.

References 

Natural phenols
Salicylic acids
Salicylyl ethers
Hydroquinone ethers